The 8th Mountain Huntsmen Company is a unit of the Argentine Army specialised in mountain warfare. The Company is based at based Puente del Inca, Mendoza Province. The name of the unit is "Teniente 1ro Ibañez". This unit is part of the 8th Mountain Infantry Brigade. The troops and soldiers of this unit wear a tan beret with unit insignia.

See also
Mountain warfare
8th Mountain Infantry Brigade
Cazadores de Montaña

External links 
 Official website
 Organization and equipment
 Argentine Infantry Official website
 8th Mountain Infantry Brigade

Army units and formations of Argentina
Mountain units and formations